Pak Chom is the northeasternmost district (amphoe) of Loei province, northeastern Thailand.

History
The minor district (king amphoe) Pak Chom was created on 1 September 1967, when the three tambons, Pak Chom, Hat Khamphi, and Chiang Klom, were split off from Chiang Khan district. It was upgraded to a full district in 1971.

Geography
Neighboring districts are (from the east clockwise): Sangkhom of Nong Khai province; Na Yung, Nam Som of Udon Thani province; Na Duang, Mueang Loei, and Chiang Khan of Loei Province. To the north is Vientiane province of Laos.

The important water resources are the Mekong and Chom Rivers.

Administration
The district is divided into six communes (tambons), which are further subdivided into 50 villages (mubans). There are two townships (thesaban tambons). Pak Chom and Chiang Klom each cover parts of the same-named tambons. There are a further six tambon administrative organizations (TAO).

References

External links
amphoe.com

Pak Chom